Raymond 'Ray' Niuia (born 1991) is a New Zealand born Samoan rugby union player who currently plays for Moana Pasifika in Super Rugby and  in the Bunnings NPC. His position of choice is Hooker.

Bunnings NPC

In 2018 Niuia his debut for the Tasman Mako against  at Lansdowne Park. Niuia made 10 appearances for the Mako in the 2018 season as the side finished third in the premiership division. Niuia missed the 2019 Mitre 10 Cup due to commitments with Samoa and the 2020 Mitre 10 Cup with injury as the Mako won back to back premiership titles.

Niuia signed with the Manawatu Turbos for the 2021 Bunnings NPC.

Super Rugby
Niuia was named in the 2019  squad but only played 1 game before being named in the  squad for the 2020 Super Rugby season. He suffered a season ending injury on his Blues debut. He signed with Moana Pasifika for the 2022 Super Rugby Pacific season.

Samoa
On 23 August 2019, he was named in Samoa's 34 man training squad for the 2019 Rugby World Cup, before being named in the final 31 on 31 August.

References

External links 
 

Living people
Samoan rugby union players
1991 births
Samoa international rugby union players
North Harbour rugby union players
Tasman rugby union players
Highlanders (rugby union) players
Blues (Super Rugby) players
Manawatu rugby union players
Moana Pasifika players
Rugby union hookers